In mathematics, the Jacquet–Langlands correspondence is a correspondence  between automorphic forms on GL2 and its twisted forms, proved by  in their book Automorphic Forms on GL(2) using the Selberg trace formula. It was one of the first examples of the Langlands philosophy that maps between L-groups should induce maps between automorphic representations. There are generalized versions of the Jacquet–Langlands correspondence relating automorphic representations of GLr(D) and GLdr(F), where D is a division algebra of degree d2 over the local or global field F.

Suppose that G  is an inner twist of the algebraic group GL2, in other words the multiplicative group of a quaternion algebra. The Jacquet–Langlands correspondence is bijection between
Automorphic representations of G  of dimension greater than 1
Cuspidal automorphic  representations of GL2 that are square integrable (modulo the center) at each ramified place of G.
Corresponding representations have the same local components at all unramified places of G.

 and  extended the Jacquet–Langlands correspondence to division algebras of higher dimension.

References

Automorphic forms
Theorems in harmonic analysis